Mujtaba is an Arabic given name meaning 'the Chosen'. It is an honorific title for the Islamic prophet Muhammad and his grandson Hasan.

Given name 

 Mujtaba Ali (1904–1974), Bengali poet
 Mujtaba Faiz (born 1982), Afghan footballer
 Mujtaba al-Shirazi (born 1943), Iraqi Shia cleric
 Mujtaba Sayed Jaafar (born 1981), Qatari footballer

Surname 

 Asif Mujtaba (born 1967), Pakistani cricketer
 Kazi Mujtaba (born 1908), Pakistani politician 
 Gholam Mujtaba (born 1955), Pakistani American politician

References 

Arabic-language surnames